Friends is the debut album by Japanese idol artist Erina Mano.

Introduction 
Released December 16, 2009 in Japan under the label Hachama, under Hello! Project, the album is produced by Taisei (たいせい), former member of the group Sharam Q, and reached the 33rd place of Oricon.

It also comes in limited with a different cover and a DVD extra edition.

Track listing 

Limited edition DVD
 Manoeri History (まのえりHISTORY?)

Personnel 
 KAN (かん) – Programmation / Music / Lyrics
 Taisei (たいせい) – Programmation / Piano / Percussions
 Yasuo Asai (朝井泰生) – Programmation / Guitar
 Satoshi Takahashi Ichi (高橋諭一) – Programmation / Acoustic Guitar / Backing vocal
 Hachi Sekiguchi-gen (関口源八) – Percussions
 Seisoku Suzuki (鈴木正則) – Trompet
 Yoshinari Take-jō (竹上良成) – Saxophone
 Atsuko Inaba (稲葉貴子) – Backing vocal
 Ochiai Yūko (落合夕子) – Backing vocal
 Atsushi Shindō (新堂敦士) – Backing vocal
 S/mileage (スマイレージ) – Backing vocal
 Kaori Nishina (仁科かおり) – Backing vocal
 Yoshiko Miura (三浦徳子) – Lyrics
 Hatake (畠山俊昭) – Music
 Solaya (ソラヤ) – Programmation
 Yūgo Sasakura (佐々倉有吾) – Programmation

2009 debut albums
Erina Mano albums